Collateralized debt obligations (CDOs) involve several parties. The following is a list of CDO managers and sponsors.

CDO managers

 GoldenTree Asset Management
 Trust Company of the West
 Cohen & Company
 Ellington Management
 Deutsche Bank
 Wharton Asset Management
 Credit Suisse
 Vanderbilt Capital Advisors
 First Tennessee
 Deerfield Capital
 PIMCO
 WestLB
 Aladdin Capital
 Highland Capital Management
 Fortress Investments
 Bear Stearns
 BNP Paribas
 Resource America
 Citigroup
 MassMutual
 Merrill Lynch
 Invesco
 Rabobank
 Intermediate Capital Group

CDO sponsors

 Merrill Lynch
 Citigroup
 UBS
 Deutsche Bank
 Wachovia
 Capmark
 LNR Partners
 NorthStar
 Newcastle Investments
 BlackRock Financial
 Sorin Capital Management
 Massachusetts Financial Services
 ARCap
 Capital Trust
 CWCapital 	
 Marathon Asset Management 	
 Guggenheim Structured Real Estate 	
 Teachers Insurance
 Arbor Realty
 Goldman Sachs
 Maples Finance
 Wrightwood Capital
 JE Robert Cos
 Brascan Real Estate Financial Partners
 CBRE Realty Finance
 Legg Mason Real Estate Investors
 Attentus Management
 Alliance Capital Management
 Five Mile Capital 	
 Morgan Stanley
 Prima Capital
 UNIQA Alternative Investments
 Credit Suisse
 Fortress Investments
 Shinsei Bank
 Vertical Capital
 Capital Lease Funding
 Redwood Trust
 Deutsche Genossenschafts-Hypothekenbank
 Collineo Asset Management
 Arch Commercial
 Maples Finance

References

CDO
Fixed income